Charles Alfred Ernest Corea was a Sri Lankan lawyer. He was a Proctor of the Supreme Court. His father was Dr. James Alfred Ernest Corea, the prominent physician  of Chilaw who was the brother of Sri Lankan freedom fighters Charles Edgar Corea and Victor Corea.

Education

Corea was educated at the prestigious S. Thomas' College, Mount Lavinia. and went on to become an Attorney-at-Law in the town of Piliyandala in Sri Lanka. His step-brother was Reverend Canon Ivan Corea who was Rural Dean of Colombo of the Church of Ceylon and Examining Chaplain to the Bishop of Colombo. Corea built up a reputation as a man of integrity and was a respected lawyer in Piliyandala.

Descendant of King Dominicus Corea (Edirille Rala)
Charles Alfred Ernest Corea and his family are direct descendants of King Dominicus Corea who was also known as Edirille Rala. Dominincus Corea was crowned King of Kotte and Sitawaka by King Vimala Dharma Suriya of the Kandyan kingdom in 1596. Dominicus Corea rebelled against the Portuguese and fought many battles before he was captured and
executed on 14 July 1596.

Sri Lankan author Kumari Jayawardena, writing about the Coreas observed: 'Unconnected to the liquor trade but making their money on plantation ventures was the Corea Family of Chilaw, an influential goyigama group with a history going back to Portuguese rule when they were warriors to Sinhala kings. During Dutch and British rule, members of the family were officials serving the state in various ways and rewarded with titles. Some members of the family took to the legal and medical professions, most notably the sons of Charles Edward Corea (a solicitor), who were active in local politics and in the Chilaw Association which campaigned against British land policies - especially the Waste Lands Ordinance, and for political reforms. The most active of Corea's sons was C.E.(Charles Edgar) who spoke up for peasant rights and was militant in his stand against the government. He was President of the Ceylon National Congress in 1924. C.E.Corea's brother, Alfred Ernest, was a doctor (Ernie Corea's father) and the youngest Victor Corea was a lawyer who achieved fame for leading a campaign (and going to jail) in 1922 to protest the Poll Tax on all males; he was the first President of the Ceylon Labour Union led by A.E.Goonesinha and was active in the Ceylon Labour Party. While being professionals and political activists, the Coreas were also important landowners. '  Ernie Corea owned extensive land in Piliyandala.

Edirimanne Corea Family Union
He was a leading member of the Edirimanne Corea Family Union. The Corea family that hails from Chilaw and has produced freedom fighters, members of the Legislative Council, State Council, House of Representatives, the diplomatic corps, broadcasting and print media and professionals in many fields, are knit together by an active family union.

Death
Ernie Corea died in Piliyandala in June 2010.

See also
Dominicus Corea
James Alfred Ernest Corea
Edirimanne Corea Family Union
Supreme Court of Sri Lanka
Piliyandala
List of political families in Sri Lanka

References

Further reading
The Mahavamsa - History of Sri Lanka, The Great Chronicle of Sri Lanka
Ceylon and the Portuguese, 1505-1658  By P.E. Peiris (1920)
The Conquest of Ceylon (Volumes 1-6) By Fr. Fernao de Queyroz, tr. Fr. S. G. Perera, Ceylon Government Press, (1930)
Great Sinhalese Men and Women of History - Edirille Bandara (Domingos Corea) By John M. Senaveratna, (1937)
A History of Sri Lanka By Professor K.M.De Silva (1981)
The Fall of a Warrior - Edirille Bandara By Sarath Kumarawardane (2006)
Twentieth Century Impressions of Ceylon: Its History, People, Commerce, Industries and Resources By A.W. Wright, Asian Educational Services, India; New Ed edition (15 December 2007)

External links
The Obituary on Charles Alfred Ernest (Ernie) Corea, Daily Mirror, Sri Lanka
Mahatma Gandhi and the Corea Family of Chilaw
References to King Dominicus Corea in Twentieth Century Impressions of Ceylon by Arnold Wright
The Family Gatherings of Sri Lankan Society By Dr. Mirando Obeysekere, Daily News, Sri Lanka

2010 deaths
Sinhalese lawyers
1920 births
Charles Alfred Ernest
People from Chilaw